These are the Canadian number-one albums of 2004. The chart is compiled by Nielsen Soundscan and published by Jam! Canoe, issued every Sunday. The chart also appears in Billboard magazine as Top Canadian Albums.

See also
List of Canadian number-one singles of 2004

References

External links
Top 100 albums in Canada on Jam
Billboard Top Canadian Albums

2004
Canada albums
2004 in Canadian music